Trombidium holosericeum is a species of mite in the genus Trombidium. It occurs in Europe, Asia, and North Africa and is commonly confused with other red mite species.

Description

This species is one of the largest mites in northern temperate zones, with a body length of about ). The soft, brightly red body is covered with fine hairs, giving it a velvety appearance. The small eyes are located on stalks. They have scissor-like chelicerae and their pedipalps are used as touch organs.

Its bright red color results from carotenoids, warning predators about the toxicity of the mite (aposematism). Almost nothing is known about the toxic substances used, but they are probably contained within the integument.

Biology
While adults live freely and are often found wandering about, searching for small animals and insect eggs for food, the larvae try to find a host to attach themselves to, often an insect like a grasshopper or diptere, but also arachnids like harvestmen or spiders. At this stage they are seen as red globules on their hosts, sucking body liquid without severely harming the host. These larvae then develop into free-living nymphs that resemble adults.

References

Further reading
 Synopsis of the described Arachnida of the World: Trombidiidae
 Bellmann, Heiko: Spinnentiere Europas. Kosmos, Stuttgart 2001,  (German)

Trombidiidae
Animals described in 1758
Taxa named by Carl Linnaeus